Joe Saylor is a percussionist, educator, jazz musician and member of the house band for The Late Show with Stephen Colbert.

Early life and education 

Saylor was born in Indiana, Pennsylvania, to musical parents. His mother Paula and father Nevin are music teachers for Purchase Line and Indiana Area School Districts respectively. He also has a brother, Ben, who teaches music at the Indiana Area School District's elementary schools.

Joe Saylor began playing drums at age three. He was in a jazz trio called Paj 3 with bassist Phil Kuehn (a fellow Indiana native) and pianist Angelo Versace throughout high school.

Saylor graduated from Indiana Area Senior High School in 2004, and later attended the Manhattan School of Music and the Juilliard School.

Career
Saylor plays percussion in The Late Show Band, the house band for The Late Show with Stephen Colbert. He also performs at various jazz clubs, festivals, and venues worldwide. He has conducted jazz workshops at various educational institutions including Stanford University. He has performed at such places as the Howard Theater, the White House, Lincoln Center, Rockwood Music Hall, Webster Hall, and the Great GoogaMooga. 

He has performed or recorded with Roy Hargrove, Wynton Marsalis, Dwayne Dolphin, Steve Wilson, Joe Lovano, Jon Faddis, Slide Hampton, and Ellis Marsalis.

He appeared on the cover and feature article of the April 2016 issue of Modern Drummer, was featured in the March 2014 issue of Drum Magazine, and appeared on the HBO series Treme in 2010.

Endorsements 
Saylor endorses Tama Drums, Avedis Zildjian Company, Vic Firth and Remo.

References

External links 

Living people
People from Indiana, Pennsylvania
American percussionists
Jazz percussionists
The Late Show Band members
Year of birth missing (living people)
The Late Show with Stephen Colbert